Leonardo Exequiel Sequeira (born 26 April 1995) is an Argentine professional footballer who plays as a winger for Spanish club Real Oviedo.

Career
Sequeira started his career in Santiago del Estero with Central Córdoba, after youth spells with Agua y Energía and Vélez de San Ramón. He made his senior debut on 26 March 2014 versus Gimnasia y Esgrima, playing the final twenty-five minutes in a 1–0 Torneo Federal A win. In the following November, Sequeira scored his first goal in a win against Unión Aconquija which secured promotion to the 2015 Primera B Nacional. He went on to score eight goals in sixty-nine matches in the second tier. On 16 August 2017, Sequeira joined Argentine Primera División side Belgrano on loan. His top-flight debut came vs. Tigre on 22 September.

He made his 100th career appearance during a draw away to Defensa y Justicia on 12 March 2018. Belgrano purchased Sequeira permanently at the conclusion of the 2017–18 campaign. On 10 December 2021, Sequeira signed a new deal with Belgrano until the end of 2023 and was simultaneously loaned out to Liga MX club Querétaro for the 2022 season, with a purchase option.

Career statistics

References

External links

1995 births
Living people
Argentine footballers
Argentine expatriate footballers
People from La Banda
Association football forwards
Sportspeople from Santiago del Estero Province
Torneo Argentino A players
Torneo Federal A players
Primera Nacional players
Liga MX players
Argentine Primera División players
Central Córdoba de Santiago del Estero footballers
Club Atlético Belgrano footballers
Querétaro F.C. footballers
Real Oviedo players
Argentine expatriate sportspeople in Mexico
Expatriate footballers in Mexico
Argentine expatriate sportspeople in Spain
Expatriate footballers in Spain